"Hollywood Hills" is a song recorded by Finnish rock band Sunrise Avenue for their third studio album, Out of Style (2011).

Overview
"Hollywood Hills" was written by the lead vocalist of the band, Samu Haber, while the production was done by Finnish producer and musician Jukka Immonen. It is an emo-pop song, which according to Jon O'Brien of AllMusic helps the band sound tighter than ever.

It was released as the lead single from the album on 25 February 2011; the song was made available for digital download via Amazon.
Following its release it charted in several European countries. It was more successful in Finland where it reached #2. It also reached #3 in Austria, Germany and Switzerland.

Credits and personnel 
Credits adapted from the liner notes of Out of Style.
Locations
Recorded at Studio Petrax and Fried Music in Finland

Personnel

Songwriting – Samu Haber
Production – Jukka Immonen
Recording – Arttu Peljo, Jukka Immonen
Programming – Jukka Immonen
Strings – Lasse Enersen

Charts

Weekly charts

Year-end charts

Certifications

References 

2011 songs
2011 singles
Capitol Records singles
Sunrise Avenue songs